The freestyle relay swimming events for the 2020 Summer Paralympics will take place at the Tokyo Aquatics Centre from August 26 to August 31, 2021. A total of 5 events will be contested.

Schedule

Medal summary
The following is a summary of the medals awarded across all freestyle relay events.

Results
The following were the results of the finals only of each of the freestyle relay events in each of the classifications. Further details of each event, including where appropriate heats and semi finals results, are available on that event's dedicated page.

Mixed 20pts 4x50m

The final in this classification will take place on 26 August 2021:

Mixed 49pts 4x100m
The final in this classification will take place on 31 August 2021:

Mixed S14 4x100m
The final in this classification will take place on 28 August 2021:

Men's 34pts 4x100m
The final in this classification will take place on 30 August 2021:

Women's 34pts 4x100m

The final in this classification took place on 29 August 2021. In the competition, both Great Britain and the United States were disqualified for early takeoffs in the second exchange. United States filed a protest but the decision was upheld.

References

Swimming at the 2020 Summer Paralympics